This is a list of notable telephone company buildings.  

Telephone company buildings have played a key role in the telecommunications industry for more than a century.  In 2008 it was stated that "the job for which these unassuming but ubiquitous brick houses were built, and the technology within them, are changing dramatically.  In fact, it's tough to say what the CO will look like 10 years from now."  Some challenges are "far higher power densities, heat dissipation requirements and power feeds than we ever built those locations for in the past," said Pieter Poll, chief technology officer for Qwest Communications.

A number of telephone company buildings have been listed on the U.S. National Register of Historic Places for their architecture; see :Category:Telecommunications buildings on the National Register of Historic Places.

United States
Old Bell Telephone Building (Osceola, Arkansas), listed on the NRHP in Mississippi County, Arkansas
Telephone Exchange Building (Powhatan, Arkansas), listed on the National Register of Historic Places in Lawrence County, Arkansas
Mountain States Telephone and Telegraph Exchange Building (Prescott, Arizona), listed on the NRHP in Prescott, Arizona
Telephone Building (Denver, Colorado), NRHP-listed
Southern New England Telephone Company Building, Hartford, Connecticut, NRHP-listed
Southern New England Telephone Company Administration Building, New Haven, Connecticut, Art Deco, NRHP-listed
Telephone Exchange Building (Norwich, Connecticut), listed on the National Register of Historic Places in New London County, Connecticut
Southern Bell Telephone Company Building, Atlanta, Georgia, listed on the NRHP in Georgia
Rocky Mountain Bell Telephone Company Building (Idaho Falls, Idaho), listed on the NRHP in Bonneville County, Idaho
Mountain States Telephone and Telegraph Company Building (Meridian, Idaho), listed on the NRHP in Ada County, Idaho
Telephone Company Bungalow, Paris, Idaho, listed on the NRHP in Bear Lake County, Idaho
Chicago Telephone Company Kedzie Exchange, Chicago, Illinois, listed on the NRHP in west side Chicago, Illinois
Swedish American Telephone Company Building, Chicago, Illinois, listed on the NRHP in Near East Side, Chicago, Illinois
Blackstone House and Martinsville Telephone Company Building, Martinsville, Indiana, listed on the NRHP in Morgan County, Indiana
American Telephone & Telegraph Co. Building (Davenport, Iowa), NRHP-listed
Union Electric Telephone & Telegraph, Davenport, Iowa, NRHP-listed
Interior Telephone Company Building, Grinnell, Iowa, listed on the NRHP in Poweshiek County, Iowa
New England Telephone Building, Quincy, Massachusetts
Mountain States Telephone and Telegraph Company Building (Miles City, Montana), listed on the NRHP in Custer County, Montana
Bell Telephone Building (St. Louis, Missouri), NRHP-listed
Beaumont Telephone Exchange Building, St. Louis, Missouri, listed on the NRHP in St. Louis, Missouri
Independent Telephone Company Building, Missoula, Montana, listed on the NRHP in Missoula County, Montana
Lincoln Telephone & Telegraph Exchange Building in Fairmount, Fairmont, Nebraska, listed on the NRHP in Fillmore County, Nebraska
Nebraska Telephone Company Building, Lincoln, Nebraska, listed on the NRHP in Lancaster County, Nebraska
Webster Telephone Exchange Building, Omaha, Nebraska
Bell Laboratories Building (Manhattan), known also as Bell Telephone Laboratories, New York, New York, NRHP-listed and a National Historic Landmark List of RHPs in NYC
Central New York Telephone and Telegraph Building, Syracuse, New York, NRHP-listed, in Onondaga County
Snow Camp Mutual Telephone Exchange Building, Snow Camp, North Carolina, listed on the NRHP in Alamance County, North Carolina
Telephone Co. Building (Grand Forks, North Dakota), NRHP-listed, in Grand Forks County
Cincinnati and Suburban Telephone Company Building, Cincinnati, Ohio, NRHP-listed
Old Telephone Building (Fredericktown, Ohio), listed on the NRHP in Knox County, Ohio
Marion County Telephone Company Building, Marion, Ohio, listed on the NRHP in Marion County, Ohio
Southwestern Bell Telephone Building (Stroud, Oklahoma), listed on the NRHP in Lincoln County, Oklahoma
Bell Telephone Company Building (Philadelphia, Pennsylvania), NRHP-listed
Bell Telephone Exchange Building (Powelton Village, Philadelphia, Pennsylvania), listed on the NRHP in west Philadelphia, Pennsylvania
 Bell Telephone Building (Pittsburgh, Pennsylvania), a relatively tall building
Providence Telephone Building, Providence, Rhode Island, NRHP-listed
American Telephone and Telegraph Company Building (Denmark, South Carolina), listed on the NRHP in Bamberg County, South Carolina
Southwestern Telegraph and Telephone Building, Austin, Texas, listed on the NRHP in Travis County, Texas
San Angelo Telephone Company Building, San Angelo, Texas, listed on the NRHP in Tom Green County, Texas
San Marcos Telephone Company, San Marcos, Texas, listed on the NRHP in Hays County, Texas
Mountain States Telephone and Telegraph Building (Brigham City, Utah), listed on the NRHP in Box Elder County, Utah
Mountain States Telephone and Telegraph Co. Garage, Salt Lake City, Utah, listed on the NRHP in Salt Lake City, Utah
Pacific Telephone and Telegraph Building, Longview, Washington, listed on the NRHP in Cowlitz County, Washington
Sunset Telephone & Telegraph Building, Tacoma, Washington, listed on the NRHP in Pierce County, Washington
Vancouver Telephone Building (Vancouver, Washington), listed on the NRHP in Clark County, Washington
Chesapeake and Potomac Telephone Company Building, Washington, D.C., listed on the NRHP in Northwest Quadrant, Washington, D.C.
Chesapeake and Potomac Telephone Company Warehouse and Repair Facility, Washington, D.C., National Register of Historic Places listings in Washington, D.C.
Chesapeake and Potomac Telephone Company, Old Main Building, Washington, D.C., listed on the NRHP in Northwest Quadrant, Washington, D.C.
Wisconsin Telephone Company Building, La Crosse, Wisconsin, listed on the NRHP in La Crosse County, Wisconsin

See also
Telephone Company Building (disambiguation)
Bell Telephone Building (disambiguation)
Mountain States Telephone and Telegraph Building (disambiguation)
Telephone Exchange Building (disambiguation)

References

Telephone exchange buildings
Telecommunications buildings in the United States